Federal Highway 80 (Carretera Federal 80) connects Tampico, Tamaulipas, to San Patricio, Jalisco. Federal Highway 80 connects the city of Guadalajara to the south coast in Jalisco. The highway runs through the towns of Acatlán de Juárez, Villa Corona, Cocula, Tecolotlán, Unión de Tula, Autlán, La Huerta, Casimiro Castillo, and San Patricio (Melaque).

Federal Highway 80 is interrupted in two different sections (as outlined by the SCT) of the otherwise contiguous route: Along Mexican Federal Highway 57 for 109.62 km from San Luis Potosí City to El Huizache in San Luis Potosí and along Mexican Federal Highway 85 for 31.1 km from Antiguo Morelos to Ciudad Mante in Tamaulipas.

References

080